Entouch was an American male Alternative  R&B group, composed of Eric McCaine and Eric Smith, also known as Free. They were signed to Elektra Entertainment during the height of the new jack swing era. The duo's 1989 debut album was called All Nite and featured two singles, "II Hype" and "All Nite". 

The single "II Hype", released in 1989, peaked at No 18 on the Billboard R&B chart.

In 1990, the single "All Nite" entered the U.S. Billboard Hot 100 peaked at No. 71 (R&B No. 7). 

The group released a self-titled second album in 1991. Soon after, Entouch disbanded, and McCaine went on to work in music production with other artists such as Keith Sweat, Jadakiss, Eve, Mista, Swizz Beatz, Bone Thugs N Harmony, Kut Klose and Lorenzo.

Discography
 All Nite (Released: June 19, 1989)
 Entouch (Released: October 29, 1991)

Singles
 "Too Hype" (1989)
 "All Nite" (1990)
 "Drop Dead Gorgeous" (1991)

References

External links
Entouch, Discogs.com

Elektra Records artists
New jack swing music groups